Gololobovka is the name of several rural localities in Russia:
Gololobovka, Kaluga Oblast, a village in Zhizdrinsky District of Kaluga Oblast
Gololobovka, Kursk Oblast, a selo in Leshchinoplatavsky Selsoviet of Solntsevsky District in Kursk Oblast
Gololobovka, Tambov Oblast, a selo in Glazkovsky Selsoviet of Michurinsky District in Tambov Oblast